Spiral Ascent is the debut album by Indian Heavy Metal band Kryptos. The album was released on June 25, 2004 through the band's own mini label, Clandestine Musick.

Niklas Sundin of Dark Tranquillity designed the artwork for the album cover.

Track listing
 "Cursed Evolution" – 1:01
 "Altered Destinies" – 6:20
 "Forgotten Land of Ice" – 5:26
 "Clandestine Elements" – 5:13
 "In Twilight's Grace" – 7:50
 "Expedition to Abnormalia" – 4:44
 "Satyr Like Face" – 4:25
 "Forsaken" – 6:01
 "Descension" – 7:02
 "Spiral Ascent" – 5:56

Line up
 Ganesh K – Bass, Vocals
 Nolan Lewis – Guitar
 Akshay Patel – Guitar
 Ryan Colaco – Drums

External links
  Download of the album

2004 albums
Kryptos (band) albums